Affinia represents many things, including the following:

Affinia Hotels, a luxury hotel chain
Affinia Group, a motor industry company